Statistics of Empress's Cup in the 1996 season.

Overview
It was contested by 20 teams, and Nikko Securities Dream Ladies won the championship.

Results

1st round
Akita FC 0-3 OKI FC Winds
Kochi JFC Rosa 0-6 Yomiuri Menina
Toyama Ladies SC 0-4 Shimizudaihachi SC
Shiroki FC Serena 5-0 Takarazuka Bunnys Junior

2nd round
Nikko Securities Dream Ladies 4-0 OKI FC Winds
Scramble FC 0-11 Fujita SC Mercury
Suzuyo Shimizu FC Lovely Ladies 7-0 Sapporo Linda
Yomiuri Menina 2-3 Takarazuka Bunnys
Yomiuri-Seiyu Beleza 8-0 Shimizudaihachi SC
Morioka Zebla LFC 0-8 Matsushita Electric Panasonic Bambina
Tasaki Perule FC 2-0 Urawa FC
Shiroki FC Serena 1-5 Prima Ham FC Kunoichi

Quarterfinals
Nikko Securities Dream Ladies 3-1 Fujita SC Mercury
Suzuyo Shimizu FC Lovely Ladies 8-5 Takarazuka Bunnys
Yomiuri-Seiyu Beleza 2-1 Matsushita Electric Panasonic Bambina
Tasaki Perule FC 3-4 Prima Ham FC Kunoichi

Semifinals
Nikko Securities Dream Ladies 3-2 Suzuyo Shimizu FC Lovely Ladies
Yomiuri-Seiyu Beleza 3-2 Prima Ham FC Kunoichi

Final
Nikko Securities Dream Ladies 3-0 Yomiuri-Seiyu Beleza
Nikko Securities Dream Ladies won the championship.

References

Empress's Cup
1996 in Japanese women's football